A snowdrift is a deposit of snow sculpted by wind into a mound during a snowstorm.  Snowdrifts resemble sand dunes and are formed in a similar manner, namely, by wind moving light snow and depositing it when the wind has virtually stopped, usually against a stationary object. Snow normally crests and slopes off toward the surface on the windward side of a large object. On the leeward side, areas near the object are a bit lower than surrounding areas, but are generally flatter.

The impact of snowdrifts on transportation can be more significant than the snowfall itself, such as in the USA during the Great Blizzard of 1978. Snow fences may be employed on the windward side of the road to intentionally create a drift before the snow-laden wind reaches the road.

Photo gallery

See also
 Blizzard
 Lake-effect snow
 Snow
 Snow removal

External links
  Snowdrift Exhibit at Evansville Museum

Snow or ice weather phenomena
Aeolian landforms